Priluky is a rural locality (a village) in Chekuyevskoye Rural Settlement of Onezhsky District, Arkhangelsk Oblast, Russia. The population was 103 as of 2010. There are 5 streets.

Geography 
Priluky is located on the left bank of the Onega River, 141 km southeast of Onega (the district's administrative centre) by road. Zalesye is the nearest rural locality.

References 

Rural localities in Onezhsky District
Onezhsky Uyezd